Dimitris Agathangelidis (born March 7, 1998) is a Greek-Swedish professional basketball player for Cazorla Jaén of the Liga EBA.

References

External links
Eurobasket.com profile
RealGM profile
FIBA Europe Cup profile
Sfera Sports profile

1998 births
Greek men's basketball players
Living people
Point guards
Södertälje Kings players
Sportspeople from Stockholm
Swedish men's basketball players